In Mexican football, the Big Four (Spanish: Los cuatro grandes) is a group of four clubs: Club América, Guadalajara (commonly known as Chivas), Cruz Azul and Pumas UNAM. They are considered by the local press to be the most popular and successful sides in Mexico football.

Clubs

Mexico City is home to three members of the Liga MX Cuatro Grandes. Club América, Cruz Azul and Pumas UNAM have gloried pasts, with 28 Liga MX titles among them. Guadalajara (Chivas) located in Zapopan brings the total count of Liga MX titles between them to 40.

Rivalries

El Súper Clásico

Chivas has developed two important rivalries over the years. Perhaps its most intense rivalry is with Mexico City-based Club América. Their meetings, which have become known as El Súper Clásico (Spanish for "The Super Classic"), are played at least twice a year and signal a national derby. Both were the most successful and most popular teams in Mexico. The first confrontation between them ended with a victory for Guadalajara with a score of 3–0.The rivalry began to flourish after the second match when Club América defeated Guadalajara with a score of 7–2. Although the huge defeat sparked embarrassment within Chivas, it was almost two decades before the rivalry became The Clásico. One of the very reasons why these two teams are archrivals is because in 1983 and 1986 they brawled with each other, raising excitement among the fans. Thus, every time they play it is considered a match that everyone will remember. To this day, El Clásico de Clásicos continues to raise huge excitement in the whole country as well as in other parts of the world where there are fans of either team. The intensity of the game is lived so passionately that every time these two teams play a game, regardless of what position they are in on the charts or what level they show throughout the league, it is always considered the most important game of the season. El Súper Clásico was ranked 67th on FourFourTwo's 50 biggest derbies list behind the clásico between Tigres UANL and Rayados currently the best teams in Mexico.

Clásico Capitalino

The rivalry between Club América and Pumas UNAM is known as the "Clásico Capitalino" (Spanish for "Capitol Classic"), due to the fact that both teams are based in Mexico City—the country's capital. The first match between the two clubs took place on 1 July 1962, where América hosted UNAM, who had recently been promoted from the second division. In Mexico the match is often perceived as the representation of a struggle between two antagonistic powers and institutions: Club América is regarded as the club representing the establishment and the wealthy. The fact that the club is owned by the mass media company Televisa has further intensified this image. Pumas UNAM representing the Universidad Nacional Autónoma de México, identifies itself as the club of the intellectuals and middle-class. The rivalry is particularly fierce from UNAM's side: according to surveys the majority of their supporters consider América as their main rival. However, America's fans see it as an important match but deem the match against Chivas as more important.

Clásico Joven

Club América's other capital-based rival, and the most important, is Cruz Azul, with whom they compete in the derby known as the "Clásico Joven" (Spanish for "Young Classic"). Although both teams reside in Mexico City, Cruz Azul was founded in Jasso, Hidalgo. In a similar perspective between Club América and Pumas UNAM's rivalry, the rivalry between Club América and Cruz Azul is also seen as based on social class differences: América representing the wealthy and powerful while Cruz Azul is said to represent the working class, hence fans of Cruz Azul and the team itself being dubiously referred to by the nickname of "Los Albañiles" (Spanish for bricklayers), a reference to Cruz Azul's eponymous parent company, which is one of Mexico's major companies specializing in concrete and construction.

Pumas UNAM vs. Guadalajara
In recent years, Pumas UNAM and Guadalajara have increased their rivalry. Most of it is due to the 2004 Final; Pumas UNAM vs. Guadalajara. Also, Pumas UNAM went 36 years without winning an away match against Guadalajara.

On October 6, 2018, Pumas UNAM faced Guadalajara away in Liga MX. They had won this fixture ten days earlier in the Copa MX Round of 16 by a score of 3-1, though many considered the winless streak still unbroken because it did not occur in Liga MX play. Guadalajara quickly took the lead, Isaác Brizuela opening the scoring. However Guadalajara had little time to celebrate, as Pumas tied the game shortly thereafter. The score remained 1-1 until the 66th minute, when Felipe Mora scored on a header to give Pumas UNAM the lead. Pumas UNAM then saw out the 2-1 win, officially ending the 36-year record of not winning against Guadalajara in an away match in the Liga MX.

Honours

National

Continental

International

Finals against each other

The "Year" or "Season" column refers to the season or year the competition was held, and links to the article about that match.
The two-legged finals are listed in the order they were played.

Notes

References

Football rivalries in Mexico